The Festivali i Këngës 2019 was the 58th edition of the annual Albanian music competition Festivali i Këngës. It was organised by Radio Televizioni Shqiptar (RTSH) at the Pallati i Kongreseve in Tirana, Albania, and consisted of two semi-finals on 19 and 20 December, respectively, and the final on 22 December 2019. The three live shows were hosted by Alketa Vejsiu. The winner of the contest was Arilena Ara with the song "Shaj", after receiving 67 points with two points ahead over Elvana Gjata with the song "Me tana". Ara was then scheduled to represent Albania in the Eurovision Song Contest 2020 in Rotterdam, the Netherlands, before its cancellation related to the pandemic of the coronavirus disease 2019 (COVID-19).

Background and format 

The 58th edition of Festivali i Këngës was organised by Radio Televizioni Shqiptar (RTSH) for determining for determining Albania's representative for the Eurovision Song Contest 2020. The former consisted of two semi-finals on 19 and 20 December, respectively, and the final on 22 December 2019, and was held at the Pallati i Kongreseve in Tirana. The three live shows were hosted by Albanian television presenter Alketa Vejsiu.

Interval acts 

Related to the interval acts, RTSH released the first details prior to the start of the live shows. The opening act of the first semi-final featured Albanian singer Jonida Maliqi performing "Ktheju tokës". The interval act featured Italian singer Mahmood, who performed "Barrio" and "Soldi". The second semi-final's interval act included Agim Krajka and Lindita Theodhori who performed "Kafe Flora". During the grand final, Italian singer Giusy Ferreri and Albanian-Greek singer Eleni Foureira performed mashups of several of their songs.

Contestants 

Prior to the scheduled event, in October 2019, RTSH published a provisory list of 20 artists shortlisted to compete in the two semi-finals of Festivali i Këngës, with the songs being revealed on 9 December. The broadcaster had previously opened a submission period for artists and composers to participate in the competition between May and September 2019.

Semi-finals

Semi-final 1 

The first semi-final of Festivali i Këngës took place on 19 December 2019 and was broadcast live at 21:00 (CET). The qualifying songs were selected by a jury panel consisting of two national and three international members with connections to the Eurovision Song Contest. 10 contestants participated in the first semi-final, while the highlighted contestants qualified for the grand final. The first semi-final was opened by the country's Eurovision Song Contest 2019 representative Jonida Maliqi performing her song "". The interval act included Mahmood performing his songs "" and "".

Semi-final 2 

The second semi-final of Festivali i Këngës took place on 20 December 2019 and was broadcast live at 21:00 (CET). The qualifying songs were selected by a jury panel consisting of two national and three international members with connections to the Eurovision Song Contest. 10 contestants participated in the second semi-final, while the highlighted contestants qualified for the grand final. The interval act in the second semi-final featured Agim Krajka and Lindita Theodhori with the song "".

Final 

The grand final of the competition took place on 22 December 2019 and was broadcast live at 21:00 (CET). The contestants that qualified for the final were announced on 21 December 2019, and the winner was determined by a five-member jury consisting of two Albanian members and three international members with connections to the Eurovision Song Contest. The five-member jury was made up of Christer Björkman (Sweden), Dimitris Kontopoulos (Greece), Felix Bergsson (Iceland), Mikaela Minga (Albania) and Rita Petro (Albania). Each member of the jury voted by assigning scores from 1–10, 13 and 18 points to their preferred songs. Before the end of the show, Arilena Ara emerged as the winner with "" and was simultaneously announced as Albania's representative for the Eurovision Song Contest 2020.

Controversy 

Following the results of the competition, mixed reactions followed, with multiple individuals criticising the results itself and attributing the singer's victory to arranged voting. All three international jurors ranked runner-up Elvana Gjata first, whereas the two Albanian jurors placed her performance substantially lower. Host Alketa Vejsiu expressed her dissatisfaction with the Albanian jury members' votes, stating "I believe in meritocracy and I am deeply sorry that in this platform I could not give voice to the public. I am sorry if I disappointed [the public and Elvana], I understand and respect your sensibility please spare me of accusations. I was not the jury and I did not choose the jury." Jury member Mikaela Minga, who awarded "" two points, later stated that she down-voted the song due to its "gypsy influence", stating it wasn't "Albanian enough".

See also 
 Eurovision Song Contest 2020
 Albania in the Eurovision Song Contest 2020

References 

2019
2019 in Albanian music
2019 song contests
December 2019 events in Europe
Eurovision Song Contest 2020